Stowers may refer to any one of the following:

People
Chris Stowers (born 1974), outfielder in Major League Baseball
Craig F. Stowers (1954–2022), American jurist, associate justice of the Alaska Supreme Court
Feagaiga Stowers (born 2000), Samoan weightlifter
Freddie Stowers (1896–1918), corporal in the United States Army who posthumously received the medal of honor for his actions in World War I
George Stowers (born 1979), Samoan international rugby player
Harry Stowers (1926–2015), American jurist
James E. Stowers (born 1924), the founder of American Century Investments and the Stowers Institute for Medical Research
Julia Stowers (born 1982), American swimmer
Kyle Stowers (born 1998), outfielder in Major League Baseball
Lisa Stowers, neuroscientist
Saleisha Stowers (born 1986), American fashion model
Shannon Stowers, New Zealand rugby league player for the Auckland Lions
Sherwin Stowers (born 1986), New Zealand rugby player
Tim Stowers (born 1958), the head coach of the Georgia Southern Eagles and Rhode Island Rams football teams

Other
19820 Stowers (2000 ST153), a Main-belt Asteroid discovered in 2000
Stowers Institute for Medical Research, biomedical research organization
Stowers Ranch, in the Texas Hill Country, is a cattle ranch that also provides outdoor recreation opportunities throughout the year

See also
Asa Stower House, historic home located at Queensbury, Warren County, New York, US
Harvey Stower (1944–2009), US politician and legislator
John G. Stower (1791–1851), US congressman from New York
Willy Stöwer (1864–1931), German painter
Justice Stowers (disambiguation)
Stour Provost, English village and civil parish formerly spelled Stower